"Visit to Vienna" is a song recorded by Sahara Hotnights on their 2007 studio album What If Leaving Is a Loving Thing (2007). Released as the second single from the album, it peaked at 49th position at the Swedish singles chart. The song was written by bandmembers Maria Andersson and Josephine Forsman, and was produced while collaboration with Björn Yttling.

The song charted at Trackslistan for 17 weeks between 25 August – 15 December 2007, peaking at second position. Also charting at Svensktoppen it stayed there for 31 weeks between 2 September 2007 – 30 March 2008, peaking at 4th position before leaving chart.

The band also performed the song during the 2008 Grammis Awards Ceremony. The following up music video was directed by Magnus Renfors.

Contributors 
Sahara Hotnights
 Maria Andersson – vocals, guitar
 Jennie Asplund – guitar
 Johanna Asplund – bass
 Josephine Forsman – drums

Productions
 Janne Hansson – sound engineer
 Henrik Jonsson – mastering
 Lasse Mårtén – sound engineer, sound mix
 Sahara Hotnights – producer
 Björn Yttling – producer, sound engineer, sound mix

Source:

Charts

References

2007 singles
Sahara Hotnights songs
Swedish-language songs
2007 songs
Songs about Vienna